Project X was a short-lived hardcore punk/youth crew band from New York City, and also the name of their only release, being a five-track EP. The band consisted of members of other prominent NYC hardcore bands Gorilla Biscuits, Youth of Today, Side by Side and Judge.

The band started when John Porcelly (vocalist) and Alex Brown (guitarist) planned to release a 7" compilation of rare, unreleased hardcore from the early 1980s to accompany the seventh issue of their fanzine, called 'Schism'. When they couldn't acquire the rights to release the compilation, they decided to form a 'project band', record a 7" under its name and release it with the fanzine. Fellow band members were recruited and Project X was formed. "Straight Edge Revenge" was written by John L Hancock III (aka Ratboy) for Youth of Today but was never recorded, because Ray Cappo found the lyrics to be too militant.

The record had a pressing of 500, and according to the band's bio on Bridge Nine Records' website, the majority of the records sold out at a gig in Connecticut. The record was out of print for 18 years (although it was illegally bootlegged more than once during that time), but was finally re-released in 2005 on Bridge Nine Records.

The band played few shows, estimated as low as five. These included some on the east coast of the United States, and a few during Youth of Today's European tour in 1989.

The 7-inch remained Project X's only recorded output (they were, after all, just a project, and the members were busy with their other bands). So when Porcelly as a joke put Project X – The Edge of Quarrel LP on his Maximum RocknRoll playlist during a San Francisco visit, record collectors began searching high and low for this fabled LP, but alas, it never existed. The band did however write one song that was only performed live, "Can't Keep Me Down". Later the lyrics were changed, and it became the Youth of Today song "Live Free" on the band's We're Not in This Alone album.

The band played again a couple of times in 2015 while touring with Gorilla Biscuits.

Former members
Alex Brown ("Kid Hard") - guitar 
John Porcelly ("Slam") - vocals
Walter Schreifels ("N.D.") - bass guitar
Sammy Siegler ("The Youth") - drums

Discography
 Project X (1987)

References

External links
Complete listing of Project X releases, shows and flyers

Hardcore punk groups from New York (state)
Musical groups established in 1987